The San Juan 24 is an American trailerable sailboat that was designed by Bruce Kirby as an International Offshore Rule Quarter Ton class racer.

The design was later developed into the more cruising-oriented San Juan 23 in 1975.

Production
The design was built by the Clark Boat Company in Kent, Washington, United States, starting in 1973 but it is now out of production. A total of 1200 examples of the design were built.

Design
The San Juan 24 is a recreational keelboat, built predominantly of fiberglass, with wood trim. It has a masthead sloop rig, a raked stem, a raised reverse transom, an internally-mounted spade-type rudder controlled by a tiller and a fixed fin keel. It displaces  and carries  of lead ballast.

The design has sleeping accommodation for five people.

The design has a PHRF racing average handicap of 219 with a high of 231 and low of 216.

Operational history
In a 2010 review Steve Henkel wrote, "Don Clark, designer of the San Juan 21 Mk I and II ... and owner of the Clark Boat Company of Kent, WA, went to Bruce Kirby for a hot new racer to be designed to the IOR Quarter Ton Rule. Clark imposed two important restrictions to broaden the market beyond the macho racer group: the boat could not draw more than 4' 0" or be wider than 8' 0", making the boat more useable in shoal waters and making trailering a little easier.
Best features: The boat has been a success (and, at least so far, is the most popular quarter tonner ever), with over a thousand sailing, Worst features: Although she is fast and weatherly going upwind, dead downwind in heavy air under spinnaker she can be a little squirrelly, possibly a result of her narrow underbody aft."

See also
List of sailing boat types

Similar sailboats
Achilles 24
Atlantic City catboat
Balboa 24
C&C 24
Challenger 24
Columbia 24
Dana 24
Islander 24
Islander 24 Bahama
J/24
MacGregor 24
Mirage 24
Northern 1/4 Ton
Nutmeg 24
Seidelmann 245
Shark 24
Tonic 23

References

Keelboats
1970s sailboat type designs
Sailing yachts
Trailer sailers
Sailboat type designs by Bruce Kirby
Sailboat types built by Clark Boat Company